Ortiporio is a commune in the Haute-Corse department of France on the island of Corsica.

It is part of the canton of Golo-Morosaglia.

Geography

Population

History
1934 - Night of 3 to 4 February : an avalanche caused the death of 37 persons. The snow level exceeded 1.50 m by place. A stele, in the church Saint-Augustine, reminds of this tragic disaster.

See also
Communes of the Haute-Corse department

References

Communes of Haute-Corse
Haute-Corse communes articles needing translation from French Wikipedia